Redhurst Crossing railway station was a minor station on the Leek and Manifold Light Railway, located between Wetton Mill railway station, Staffordshire and Thor's Cave railway station. Not much is documented about the halt, and the line which ran through it is now the Manifold Way.

History 
The station opened as Redhurst in August 1915 by the Leek and Manifold Light Railway. Its name was changed to Redhurst Crossing on 2 April 1923. It was also known as Redhurst Halt on some tickets. It closed on 12 March 1934.

Route

References

Disused railway stations in Staffordshire
Railway stations opened in 1915
Railway stations closed in 1934
1915 establishments in England
1934 disestablishments in England
Former Leek and Manifold Light Railway stations
Railway stations in Great Britain opened in the 20th century